Coleridge is a former parliamentary electorate in the Canterbury region of New Zealand. The electorate existed from the 1866 election to 1887.

Population centres
This electorate is in the rural part of the Canterbury Region. In the 1871 election, polling stations were in the Bealey settlement near Arthur's Pass and Ashburton, and one of the election meetings was held at Hororata. The electorate is named after Lake Coleridge.

History
The electorate was established for the 1866 general election, when the 4th Parliament was determined. John Cracroft Wilson was its first elected representative. He was elected unopposed.

In the 1871 general election, John Karslake Karslake and George Hart contested the electorate. Both men had no prior political experience. Karslake and Hart received 35 and 27 votes, respectively. Karslake was thus returned. He resigned in 1872 to return to England.

The resulting 1872 by-election was contested by George Hart, William Bluett and John Jebson on 22 July 1872. Hart, Bluett and Jebson received 99, 106 and 48 votes, respectively, with Bluett thus being elected. He served until the end of the term in 1875.

The 6 January 1876 election was contested by four people; the incumbent Bluett, Cathcart Wason, William Tosswill, and John Jebson, who received 71, 167, 160 and 53 votes, respectively. Wason was thus elected, but he resigned his seat in Parliament in April 1879. George Hart was returned unopposed in the subsequent by-election on 8 May 1879.

Members of Parliament
The electorate was represented by seven Members of Parliament:

Key

Election results

1879 election

1876 election

1872 by-election

Notes

References

Historical electorates of New Zealand
1865 establishments in New Zealand
1887 disestablishments in New Zealand
Politics of Canterbury, New Zealand